Mauro Bigonzetti (born 1960) is an Italian ballet dancer and choreographer. He trained at the ballet school of Teatro dell'Opera di Roma and entered their company in 1979.

In 1983 Bigonzetti joined the Reggio Emilia company Aterballetto, renowned for its contemporary repertory. He first began to choreograph for Aterballetto in 1990. In 1993 he joined Balletto di Toscana as resident choreographer and in 1997 returned to Aterballetto as artistic director.

Throughout his choreographic career Bigonzetti has maintained a close relationship with Aterballetto. He continues there as principal choreographer, although his career now centers on commissions written for major companies abroad.  He served as director of La Scala Ballet in 2016 but resigned for health reasons after eight months.

Choreography
His works have been staged by the Teatro dell'Opera di Roma, Balletto di Toscana, Deutsche Oper Berlin, Ankara State Ballet, English National Ballet, Julio Bocca & Ballet Argentino, Gauthier Dance, Stuttgart Ballet, Staatsoper Dresden, Ballet Gulbenkian and most recently the City Ballet of São Paulo, Brazil. For the New York City Ballet he created Vespro in 2002, In Vento 2006 and Oltremare 2008, in collaboration with the composer Bruno Moretti.

His latest work, Le Quattro Stagioni, featuring Vivaldi's famous concertos, was premiered by the Grands Ballets Canadiens on 24 May 2007, to universal critical acclaim.

Works
Pression (1994) - Balletto Di Toscana - Florence, Italy
Songs (1997) - Aterballetto - Reggio Emilia, Italy
Cantata (2001) - Gulbenkian Ballet - Lisbon, Portugal
Les Noces (2002) - Aterballetto - Reggio Emilia, Italy
Rossini Cards (2004) - Aterballetto - Reggio Emilia, Italy
Wam (2005) - Aterballetto - Reggio Emilia, Italy
Vertigo (2006) - Aterballetto - Reggio Emilia, Italy
Romeo & Juliet (2006) - Aterballetto - Reggio Emilia, Italy
InCanto (2007) - Aterballetto - Reggio Emilia, Italy
Terra (2008) - Aterballetto - Reggio Emilia, Italy
Come Un Respiro (2009) - Aterballetto - Reggio Emilia, Italy
Certe Notti (2009) - Aterballetto - Milan, Italy
Intermezzo (2012) - Aterballetto - Reggio Emilia, Italy
Alice (2014) - Gauthier Dance - Stuttgart, Germany
Cinderella (2015) - Compagnia Della Scala - Milan, Italy

See also

References

Further reading
  "Bigonzetti on the Rise – Italian Choreographer Mauro Bigonzetti", Dance Magazine, Silvia Poletti, May 1995
  "Mauro Bigonzetti: Italy's New Maestro of Dance - Aterballetto Artistic Director and Choreographer Who Will Premiere Part 2 of his Dante Trilogy 'Comoedia'". Dance Magazine, February 1999
 "Mauro Bigonzetti and Aterballetto Recreate Shakespeare in Their Own Way" Culturekiosque:Dance:Interviews, Patricia Boccadoro, 16 May 2001

External links
Aterballetto website
CARAVAGGIO-- ArthausMusik no live link to trailer
Archive footage of Mauro Bigonzetti's work Four Seasons performed by Les Grands Ballets Canadiens de Montréal in 2009 at Jacob's Pillow
Archive footage of Bigonzetti's work Cantata performed by Gauthier Dance//Dance Company Theaterhaus Stuttgart in 2016 at Jacob's Pillow

1960 births
Living people
Italian male ballet dancers
Italian choreographers
Ballet choreographers
Contemporary dance choreographers
New York City Ballet Diamond Project choreographers
Choreographers of New York City Ballet
21st-century Italian ballet dancers